Sholavandan is a state assembly constituency in Madurai district in Tamil Nadu. Sholavandan assembly constituency is a part of Theni Lok Sabha constituency. It is one of the 234 State Legislative Assembly Constituencies in Tamil Nadu in India.

Elections and winners from this constituency are listed below.

Madras State

Tamil Nadu

Election results

2021

2016

2011

2006

2001

1996

1991

1989

1984

1980

1977

1971

1967

1962

References 

 

Assembly constituencies of Tamil Nadu
Madurai district